Endoplasmic reticulum-Golgi intermediate compartment protein 2 (ERGIC2)  is a gene located on human chromosome 12p11.  It encodes a protein of 377 amino acid residues. ERGIC2 protein is also known as PTX1, CDA14 or Erv41.

The biological function of ERGIC2 protein is unknown, although it was initially identified as a candidate tumor suppressor of prostate cancer, and has been shown to induce cell growth arrest and senescence, to suppress colony formation in soft agar, and to decrease invasive potential of human prostate cancer cell line (PC-3 cells).  It is now believed to be a chaperon molecule involved in protein trafficking between the endoplasmic reticulum-Golgi intermediate compartment (ERGIC) and Golgi.  The protein contains two hydrophobic transmembrane domains that help anchoring the molecule on the ER membrane, such that its large luminal domain orients inside the ER lumen and both the N- and C-termini are facing the cytosol.  ERGIC2 forms a complex with two other proteins, ERGIC3 and ERGIC32, resulting in a shuttle for protein trafficking between ER and Golgi.  It has been shown to interact with a number of proteins, such as beta-amyloid, protein elongation factor 1alpha, and otoferlin. Therefore, it may play an important role in cellular functions besides of being a component of a protein trafficking shuttle.
More recently, a variant transcript of ERGIC2 has been reported.  It has a deletion of four bases at the junction of exons 8 and 9, resulting a frame-shift mutation after codon #189.  The variant transcript encodes a truncated protein of 215 residues, which loses 45% of the luminal domain and the transmembrane domain near the C-terminus. This effectively abrogates its function as a protein transporter. A similar variant is also reported in armadillo. So this is not a random mutation. The function of this truncated protein is unknown.

References

Further reading